Henry A. Butova (c. 1928 – February 28, 1965) was an American football, basketball and baseball coach. He served as the head football coach at American International College in Springfield, Massachusetts in 1948 and from 1952 to 1955. He was also the head basketball coach at American International in 1948—49, tallying a mark of 4–19, and the school's head baseball coach from 1947 to 1964, amassing a record of 175–144–3.

References

Year of birth missing
1920s births
1965 deaths
American International Yellow Jackets baseball coaches
American International Yellow Jackets football coaches
American International Yellow Jackets football players
American International Yellow Jackets men's basketball coaches